Jeffrey Brad "Jeff Teal (born May 30, 1960 in Rochester, Minnesota) is a retired American professional ice hockey forward who played six games in the National Hockey League for the Montreal Canadiens.

Career statistics

External links

1960 births
Living people
American men's ice hockey forwards
Ice hockey players from Minnesota
Minnesota Golden Gophers men's ice hockey players
Montreal Canadiens draft picks
Montreal Canadiens players
Nova Scotia Voyageurs players
Sherbrooke Canadiens players
Sportspeople from Rochester, Minnesota